True North Mortgage is a retail store-based mortgage brokerage established in 2006 in Calgary by Dan Eisner. True North Mortgage's model, part bank and part brokerage firm, is recognized as being highly innovative in the mortgage industry and has grown rapidly since CEO Dan Eisner opened the company's first office in Calgary in 2006. True North Mortgage is known for employing its sales professionals on salary, not on commission. CEO Dan Eisner appeared on the Canadian business television series “Dragon’s Den” (CBC) in 2007.

History

Eisner founded True North Mortgage as a low-rate brokerage firm coupled with the reliability of a bank. In 2007, Eisner appeared on the CBC business television series “Dragon’s Den,” and was offered an investment deal for True North Mortgage, which he ultimately turned down to maintain ownership and control over the TNM business model. In 2008, Dan Eisner entered into a partnership agreement with James Laird, selling him a 24% stake in the company. James opened True North's offices in Ontario and Quebec.

In 2008, True North Mortgage “ranked sixth among Canadian mortgage brokers for volume of mortgages handled.” In 2009, Avenue magazine name founder and CEO Dan Eisner to its list of the “Top 40 Under 40.” In 2012, CMP magazine named Dan Eisner the Top Broker of the Year in its list of the Top 75 Brokers based on 2011 sales figures.

In 2012, True North Mortgage was “the first Canadian mortgage broker to break the "3 per cent threshold” for five-year fixed mortgage rates.

In 2014, James Laird, left True North Mortgage.

In 2016, True North Mortgage became the first mortgage brokerage in Canada to attain the status of NHA approved lender. This status is granted by CMHC and allows True North Mortgage to underwrite insurable mortgage files.

In 2021, True North Mortgage relocated its headquarters, doubling its usable space.

References

External links
Official website

Financial services companies of Canada
Companies based in Calgary